The Darboux derivative of a map between a manifold and a Lie group is a variant of the standard derivative. It is arguably a more natural generalization of the single-variable derivative. It allows a generalization of the single-variable fundamental theorem of calculus to higher dimensions, in a different vein than the generalization that is Stokes' theorem.

Formal definition

Let  be a Lie group, and let  be its Lie algebra. Lie algebra valued form) defined by

More natural?

The reason that one might call the Darboux derivative a more natural generalization of the derivative of single-variable calculus is this. In single-variable calculus, the derivative  of a function  assigns to each point in the domain a single number. According to the more general manifold ideas of derivatives, the derivative assigns to each point in the domain a linear map from the tangent space at the domain point to the tangent space at the image point. This derivative encapsulates two pieces of data: the image of the domain point and the linear map. In single-variable calculus, we drop some information. We retain only the linear map, in the form of a scalar multiplying agent (i.e. a number).

One way to justify this convention of retaining only the linear map aspect of the derivative is to appeal to the (very simple) Lie group structure of  under addition. The tangent bundle of any Lie group can be trivialized via left (or right) multiplication. In this case, left and right multiplication are simply translation. In symbols, for each  we look at the map

Since the tangent spaces involved are one-dimensional, this linear map is just multiplication by some scalar. (This scalar can change depending on what basis we use for the vector spaces, but the canonical unit vector field  on  gives a canonical choice of basis, and hence a canonical choice of scalar.)

Uniqueness of primitives

, then there exists some constant  such that 
 for all .

This constant  is of course the analogue of the constant that appears when taking an indefinite integral.

The fundamental theorem of calculus

The structural equation for the Maurer-Cartan form is:

For any Lie algebra-valued -form on any smooth manifold, all the terms in this equation make sense, so for any such form we can ask whether or not it satisfies this structural equation.

The usual fundamental theorem of calculus for single-variable calculus has the following local generalization.

If a -valued -form  on  satisfies the structural equation, then every point  has an open neighborhood  and a smooth map  such that

See also

References

 
 

Differential calculus
Lie groups